Htoot May (born 16 June  1979) is a Burmese politician  and  currently serves as  an Amyotha Hluttaw MP for Rakhine State  No. 11 Constituency . She is a member of Arakan National Party.

Early life and education 
She was  born on  16 June  1979 in
Kyauk Tway village, Ramree Township ,  Rakhine State , Burma(Myanmar). Her parents are farmers and she is the youngest of five children. She was moved to Yangon in 1996 and attended at the University of Distance Education Dagon. She was wanted to become a nurse but  she was not able to attend. In addition, she learned English Language with an expatriate teacher at Buddhist monastery in Sanchaung Township. And then, she graduated from Dagon University with B.A(Philo) in 2002, D.S.E and L . L . F  (USA).

Life activities and business holding
Her cousins was introduced her to a private learning centre and she started going to the British Council at the weekend to practice her English, and also joined the library together with the teachers from school organized conversation clubs . She was not a party member but  Arakan League for Democracy recommended to attend some courses at the British Council. She knew more about how democratic systems work and the political system in the UK and had desired to get involved in politics. Later on, she became a  member of the Arakan League for Democracy as youth. When Cyclone Nargis devastated the Ayeyarwaddy Delta, she had helped among three months to it affected people together with NGOs and local authorities at 2008. In 2010, when Cyclone Giri caused damage to Rakhine State , she also served as a project manager of an emergency relief project. In 2011, She was joined to Arakkha Foundation. And then, she participated in education and leadership training  for Rakhine women from Arakan, Paletwa, Yangon and Ayeyarwaddy Division 
and became strongly motivated to boost development in Burma.For its result and other effort,
she had  selected as a youth leader to meet British Prime Minister David Cameron in 2012. In 2014, she was one of 18 pioneering figures from Myanmar at  the Liberty and Leadership Forum.
Htoot May was founded the Htoot May Youth and Educational Foundation on 2016 and granted scholarships to six young Arakanese women to study English for nine months.

Political career
In 2006, she became an active member of Arakan League for Democracy. In the 2015 Myanmar general election, she was elected as an Amyotha Hluttaw MP, winning a majority of 15985 votes and elected representative from Rakhine  State No. 11 parliamentary   constituency  . She also serves as the secretary at the ASEAN inter-Parliamentary Assembly in the Union legislature of 16-member Joint Committee.

References

Arakan National Party politicians
1979 births
Living people
People from Rakhine State
Arakanese politicians